Travis Wilkerson is an American independent film director, screenwriter, producer and performance artist. Named the "political conscience of 21st century American independent cinema," by Sight & Sound magazine, Wilkerson is heavily influenced by the Third Cinema movement, and known for films that combine "maximalist aesthetics and radical politics." This is owed, in part, to his meeting Cuban filmmaker Santiago Álvarez. Following the meeting, Wilkerson made the feature documentary Accelerated Under-Development about that meeting, and he was heavily involved in the rediscovery of Alvarez's films.

Films
Wilkerson's best known film, An Injury to One (2003), was called a "political-cinema landmark" in the Los Angeles Times. The film is an experimental documentary exploring the turn-of-century lynching of union organizer Frank Little, an I.W.W. union leader  combating injustice against the Anaconda Copper Mining Company in Butte, Montana.

His agit-prop noir narrative-documentary hybrid, Machine Gun or Typewriter? (2015), premiered at the Locarno International Film Festival. As translated from Il Manifesto, it is a "digression on the possible dissolution of life and love in a tragicomically apocalyptic Los Angeles, a delirium that ranges between the analog and the digital by very cleverly bypassing the image itself."

In 2007, Wilkerson presented the first performance art at the Sundance Film Festival: Soapbox Agitation #1: Proving Ground. The expanded cinema performance was described as "a scabrous assault on American imperialism inspired by the theoretical writings of Brecht and Lenin that featured Travis Wilkerson speechifying in between rockabilly protest songs as interpreted by "death folk" Los Angeles band Los Duggans," and "one of the only Sundance products that wasn't for sale."

The documentary Distinguished Flying Cross (2011) received multiple international awards. In it, "a man in the twilight of his years, who served as a helicopter combat in the Vietnam War, spiritedly recounts his experiences... His war stories, told humorously as reckless shenanigans, gradually change in tone to the viewer's eyes as they unfold within a frame composition reminiscent of religious painting and novel-like chapters."

In January 2017, Wilkerson presented the world premiere of a new "live" documentary in the New Frontier section of the Sundance Film Festival, Did You Wonder Who Fired the Gun? is described as a "documentary murder mystery about the artist’s own family is a Southern Gothic torn apart and reassembled. Journeying straight into the black heart of a family and country, this multimedia performance explores a forgotten killing by the artist’s great-grandfather — a white Southern racist — of a black man in lower Alabama." The Village Voice wrote, ""It's hard not to experience Did You Wonder Who Fired the Gun? and not get shivers up your spine - from fear, from anger, and from the beauty of Wilkerson's filmmaking." The same publication named it one of "The Ten Best Films at Sundance 2017." Writing in Artforum, Amy Taubin wrote: "this performance strategy had a powerful effect on both him and the audience. The power has to do with it being a personal story, told in the first-person; in sharing it with an audience, Wilkerson doesn’t let anyone, including himself, off the hook. 'This isn’t a white savior story. This is a white nightmare story….' one of the strongest works in a chilling Sundance Film Festival."

In addition to his longer works, Wilkerson has produced numerous short films including National Archive V.1 (2001) and Pluto Declaration (2011). The former was screened at both the Toronto International Film Festival  and the Musée du Louvre, and the latter was included in the Sundance Film Festival before sharing the prize for "Funniest Film" at the 50th Ann Arbor Film Festival.  He also contributed a segment to the omni-bus film Far From Afghanistan (2012).

Wilkerson is an avid practitioner of the manifesto. A notable example of his writing is "America Tropical...," which argues "for a true, democratic narrative; a mass, public art; immediate and urgent and infinite," by arguing the intersection of the whitewashing of the revolutionary mural painting of David Alfaro Siqueiros and the plight of a murdered Guatemalan day laborer.

Other work
Wilkerson is the founding editor of Now! Journal, which functions as the modern disseminator of the film newsreel. In its declaration, he states that "Now! responds to crisis. Now! offers the radical reply."

In addition to his work as a practitioner, he also teaches filmmaking, practice, and criticism. He was a Visiting Assistant Professor in the Department of Film at Vassar College. He has previously taught at Pomona College, CalArts, and University of Colorado, Boulder.

Honors and awards
 Machine Gun or Typewriter? Best International Feature Dokufest (2015)
 Creative Capital award (2015)
 Pluto Declaration 50th Ann Arbor Film Festival's Prix de Varti Funniest Film (2012)
 Distinguished Flying Cross Cinéma du réel's international Competition SCAM Prize (2011)
 Distinguished Flying Cross Yamagata International Documentary Film Festival's Special Prize in International Competition (2011)

Filmography

References

External links 
 http://www.traviswilkersonfilms.com/
 
 Travis Wilkerson at Vimeo
 Now! Journal

Living people
American film directors
American film producers
American screenwriters
Year of birth missing (living people)
Pomona College faculty